Te'von Coney (born June 10, 1997) is an American football linebacker for the Philadelphia Stars of the United States Football League (USFL). He played college football for the Notre Dame Fighting Irish, and signed with the Oakland Raiders as an undrafted free agent in 2019.

Early years
Coney attended Palm Beach Gardens Community High School in Palm Beach Gardens, Florida. He had 136 tackles and two interceptions as a senior and 172 tackles and two interceptions as a junior. He committed to the University of Notre Dame to play college football.

College career
As a true freshman at Notre Dame in 2015, Coney played in 12 games and recorded 13 tackles as a backup and on special teams. As a sophomore in 2016, he started nine of 12 games, recording 61 tackles. As a junior in 2017, Coney started seven of 13 games, recording 116 tackles and three sacks. Coney returned to Notre Dame for his senior year in 2018.

Professional career

Oakland / Las Vegas Raiders
Coney signed with the Oakland Raiders as an undrafted free agent on May 3, 2019. He was waived on August 31, 2019. He was re-signed to the practice squad on December 11, 2019. His practice squad contract with the team expired on January 6, 2020. He signed a reserve/future contract with the Raiders on January 24, 2020. He was waived on May 5, 2020.

On August 17, 2021, Coney re-signed with the Raiders. He was waived on August 26.

Philadelphia Stars

Coney was selected in the 30th round of the 2022 USFL Draft by the Philadelphia Stars.

References

External links
Notre Dame Fighting Irish bio

1997 births
Living people
People from Palm Beach Gardens, Florida
Players of American football from Florida
Sportspeople from the Miami metropolitan area
American football linebackers
Notre Dame Fighting Irish football players
Oakland Raiders players
Las Vegas Raiders players
Philadelphia Stars (2022) players